Diplectanocotyla is a genus of monopisthocotylean monogeneans, belonging to the family Diplectanidae. All members of this genus are parasitic on the gills of megalopid fish.

Species
According to the World Register of Marine Species, the valid species included in the genus are:
 Diplectanocotyla gracilis Yamaguti, 1953 
 Diplectanocotyla langkawiensis Lim & Gibson, 2007 
 Diplectanocotyla megalopis Rakotofiringa & Oliver, 1987 
 Diplectanocotyla parva Lim & Gibson, 2007

References

Diplectanidae
Monogenea genera